The 2014 Winston-Salem Open was a men's tennis tournament played on outdoor hard courts. It was the 46th edition of the Winston-Salem Open (as successor to previous tournaments in New Haven and Long Island), and was part of the ATP World Tour 250 Series of the 2014 ATP World Tour. It took place at the Wake Forest University in Winston-Salem, North Carolina, United States, from August 17 through August 23, 2014. It was the last event on the 2014 US Open Series before the 2014 US Open.

Singles main-draw entrants

Seeds

 Rankings are as of August 11, 2014

Other entrants
The following players received wildcards into the singles main draw:
  Kevin Anderson
  Robby Ginepri
  Ryan Harrison
  Noah Rubin

The following players received entry from the qualifying draw:
  Damir Džumhur
  Marcos Giron
  David Goffin
  Wayne Odesnik

Withdrawals
Before the tournament
  Ivan Dodig
  Alejandro Falla
  Teymuraz Gabashvili
  Santiago Giraldo
  Vasek Pospisil
  Jack Sock
  Dmitry Tursunov
  Jiří Veselý

During the tournament
  John Isner (ankle injury)

Retirements
  Ryan Harrison

Doubles main-draw entrants

Seeds

 Rankings are as of August 11, 2014

Other entrants
The following pairs received wildcards into the doubles main draw:
  Jürgen Melzer /  Lukáš Rosol
  Nicholas Monroe /  Donald Young

The following pair used a protected ranking to gain entry into the doubles main draw: 
  Colin Fleming /  Ross Hutchins

The following pair received entry as alternates:
  Florin Mergea /  João Sousa

Withdrawals
Before the tournament
  Dominic Inglot (abdominal injury)

Retirements
  David Marrero (back injury)

Champions

Singles

 Lukáš Rosol def.  Jerzy Janowicz, 3–6, 7–6(7–3), 7–5

Doubles

 Juan Sebastián Cabal /  Robert Farah def.  Jamie Murray /  John Peers, 6–3, 6–4

References

External links
Official website

2014 ATP World Tour
2014 US Open Series
2014 in American tennis
August 2014 sports events in the United States
2014